Sir John William Salmond  (3 December 1862 – 19 September 1924) was a legal scholar, public servant and judge in New Zealand.

Biography
Salmond was born in North Shields, Northumberland, England, the eldest son of William Salmond (died 1917), a Presbyterian minister and professor. His family emigrated to Dunedin, New Zealand, in 1876 where he attended Otago Boys' High School (1876–79). Salmond graduated from the University of Otago in 1882 with a Bachelor of Arts degree and later a Master of Arts. He then obtained a Gilchrist scholarship to study at University College, London, where he graduated in law and became a fellow.

Returning to New Zealand in 1887, he was admitted as a barrister and solicitor of the Supreme Court, and practised in Temuka in South Canterbury. In 1897 he was appointed professor of law at the University of Adelaide, South Australia, and in 1906 he returned to New Zealand to take up the founding chair in law at Victoria University College, Wellington. In 1907 Salmond was appointed as Counsel to the Law Drafting Office where he remained for four years, until his appointment in 1911 as Solicitor-General. He was made a King's Counsel in 1912, knighted in 1918, and appointed a judge of the Supreme Court of New Zealand (now known as the High Court) in 1920.

Salmond represented New Zealand at the Washington Naval Conference from November 1921 to February 1922. Upon his return to New Zealand he resumed his judicial duties but died, following a heart attack, in Wellington, and was buried in Karori Cemetery.

Salmond married Anne Bryham Guthrie (1861–1941), daughter of James Guthrie of Newcastle upon Tyne, England, in 1891 in Dunedin. They had two sons and a daughter, of whom the eldest, Captain William Guthrie Salmond, was killed in action in France in July 1918.

Publications
He was the author of several legal texts:
Jurisprudence or the Theory of the Law (1902) (for which Salmond was awarded the Swiney Prize in 1914 by the Royal Society of Arts)
The Law of Torts (1907) (for which Harvard University in 1911 awarded Salmond the James Barr Ames Prize for the best legal treatise published in the world over a period of five years)
Principles of the Law of Contracts (1927) with P. H. Winfield.

Two of these in particular, Salmond on Jurisprudence and Salmond on Torts, are regarded as legal classics.

Legacy
The Law Library at the University of Adelaide Law School is named in his honor.

The function room at the Victoria University of Wellington Law School in the Old Government Buildings, Wellington is called the Salmond Room, and contains a selection of Salmond-related memorabilia.

Notes

References
Diane Langmore, 'Salmond, Sir John William (1862–1924)', Australian Dictionary of Biography, Volume 11, Melbourne University Press, 1988, pp. 512–513.

J. J. Pascoe (ed), History of Adelaide and Vicinity (Adel, 1901).
McLintock, A. H. (ed.), An Encyclopaedia of New Zealand, vol 3, R. E. Owen, Government Printer, (Wellington, 1966).
A. Castles et al. (eds), Law on North Terrace (Adel, 1983).
Honorary Magistrate, Jan 1966; Observer (Adelaide), 29 May 1897.
Times (London), 22 February 1924.
letter to W. R. Phillips 9 August 1904, S. J. Way letter book (State Library of South Australia)
Alex Frame, Salmond: Southern Jurist (Victoria University Press, Wellington, 1995)

External links
 

1862 births
1924 deaths
High Court of New Zealand judges
University of Otago alumni
Alumni of University College London
New Zealand King's Counsel
Solicitors-General of New Zealand
People from North Shields
English emigrants to New Zealand
People educated at Otago Boys' High School
19th-century New Zealand lawyers
Academic staff of the University of Adelaide
Academic staff of the Victoria University of Wellington
New Zealand Knights Bachelor
Burials at Karori Cemetery
20th-century New Zealand judges
John